Woodstock is a rural locality in the local government area of Huon Valley in the South-east region of Tasmania. The 2016 census has a population of 33 for the state suburb of Woodstock.

History
Woodstock was gazetted as a locality in 1968.

Geography
The Huon River forms the western boundary.

Road infrastructure
The B68 route (Channel Highway) enters from the north-west and runs along the Huon River to the south-west, where it exits. Route C621 (Pelverata Road) starts at an intersection with B68 in the centre and runs east through the locality until it exits.

References

Localities of Huon Valley Council
Towns in Tasmania